Arturo Carmassi  (2 July 1925 – 27 January 2015) was an Italian sculptor and painter.

Life and career
Born in Lucca, Carmassi  studied at the Accademia Albertina in Turin, and held his first exhibition in 1948. In 1950 he moved to Milan, where he embraced informalism. Exhibitions of his works held around the world include the Venice Biennale, the Brooklyn Museum in New York, the  Antwerp Biennale of Sculpture and the São Paulo Art Biennial.

References

Further reading 
  Micieli, Nicola. "Carmassi: l’ossessione del segno e il debito collettivo di Duchamp", in ContemporArt. Issue 77, January 2014.

1925 births
2015 deaths
Artists from Lucca
20th-century Italian sculptors
20th-century Italian male artists
Italian male sculptors
20th-century Italian painters
Italian male painters
Accademia Albertina alumni